The 19th Sarasaviya Awards festival (Sinhala: 19වැනි සරසවිය සම්මාන උලෙළ), presented by the Associated Newspapers of Ceylon Limited, was held to honor the best films of 1988 Sinhala cinema on August 16, 1991, at the Bandaranaike Memorial International Conference Hall, Colombo 07, Sri Lanka. His Excellency The President Ranasinghe Premadasa was the chief guest at the awards night.

The film Palama Yata won the most awards with eight including Best Film.

Awards

References

Sarasaviya Awards
Sarasaviya